Serigny may refer to:

Toponyms

Canada
 Sérigny River, a tributary of the Caniapiscau River in Nord-du-Québec, Quebec

France
 Sérigny, Orne, a commune in the Orne department
 Sérigny, Vienne, a commune in the Vienne department